The APEV Pouchel II is a French amateur-built aircraft, designed by Daniel Dalby and produced by APEV of Peynier. The aircraft was supplied as plans or as a kit for amateur construction, but is no longer available. It has been replaced in production by the APEV Pouchel Light

Design and development
The Pouchel II replaced the original APEV Pouchel in production. The original Pouchel was constructed using three commercially available aluminium ladders, hence APEV is the Association pour la Promotion des Echelles Volantes, or in English, Association for the Promotion of Flying Ladders. Later the ladder manufacturer grew concerned about liability and refused to supply any more ladders. The Pouchel was then re-designed to use aeronautical rectangular aluminium tubing in place of the original ladders and the new aircraft was designated the Pouchel II. The Pouchel series are all derivatives of the classic 1930s Henri Mignet-designed Mignet Pou-du-Ciel (Flying Flea).

The Pouchel II features a cantilever rear wing with a strut-braced parasol front wing, a single-seat open cockpit without a windshield, fixed conventional landing gear and a single engine in tractor configuration. The aircraft is made from bolted-together aluminium tubing, with its flying surfaces covered in Dacron sailcloth. The prototype used a  Rotax 447 two-stroke powerplant, but the   Rotax 377 is also recommended. The  Hirth F-33 has also been fitted.

Specifications (Pouchel II)

References

External links
Official website

Homebuilt aircraft
Single-engined tractor aircraft
Pouchel II
Tandem-wing aircraft